Kropotkin is a town in Krasnodar Krai, Russia, located on the right bank of the Kuban River.

History
It was founded as Romanovsky Khutor in the late 18th century, and was renamed Kropotkin in honor of the outstanding natural scientist, geographer and revolutionary anarchist Prince Pyotr Alexeyevich Kropotkin in 4 February 1921, when it was granted town status. Population:    70,000 (1972); 42,000 (1939); 27,000 (1926).

Administrative and municipal status
Within the framework of administrative divisions, it is incorporated as the Town of Kropotkin—an administrative unit with the status equal to that of the districts. As a municipal division, the Town of Kropotkin is incorporated within Kavkazsky Municipal District as Kropotkinskoye Urban Settlement.

Transportation
The town's railway station is named Kavkazskaya.

References

Notes

Sources

Cities and towns in Krasnodar Krai
Peter Kropotkin
1921 establishments in Russia